Samuel T. Lawmaster (July 18, 1930 – March 8, 2013), known by his stage name Sammy Masters, was an American rockabilly musician. He is perhaps best known for his 1960 hit, "Rockin' Red Wing".

Career
Born Samuel T. Lawmaster in Sasakwa, Oklahoma, United States, Masters showed skill in music from an early age. At age 12 he debuted on the radio station KTUL in Tulsa with Bob Wills. When he was 16 his family moved to California, and Masters began playing in country groups in the Los Angeles area alongside Spade Cooley and Ole Rasmussen. He recorded his first solo single, "Lost Little Nickel in the Big Juke Box" on Cormac Records in 1950, and followed it with "Crazy River". After these were released Masters served in the Korean War in the Army, where he often performed for fellow soldiers.

In 1954, he returned to California and signed with 4-Star Publishing as a songwriter and demo tape recorder. Patsy Cline recorded his "Turn the Cards Slowly" for a minor hit. Interested in furthering his chances at a successful career in rockabilly, Masters recorded "Pink Cadillac" and "Whop-T-Bop" with guitarist Jimmy Bryant and released them on 4-Star in 1956, but neither sold well. Follow-ups "Angel" and "Jodie" were no more successful, even after Masters's touring schedule and television appearances on The Jack Benny Show and Town Hall Party. His contract with 4-Star ended in 1957, and he wrote for American Music for a few years. "Rockin' Red Wing" was issued on Warner Bros. Records in September 1959 before signing with Lode Records in 1960. Lode re-issued "Rockin' Red Wing" in January that year, which became a regional hit in Los Angeles and eventually reached No. 64 on the Billboard Hot 100. It gave Masters his only appearance in the UK Singles Chart when it peaked at No. 36 in June 1960. His next single, "Golden Slippers", was released nationally by Dot Records, but it was not a success, and neither was "Pierre the Poodle", his last release before losing his recording contract.

He became friends with Willie Nelson in 1961, and his song "Who Can I Count On?" became the B-side to Nelson's "Crazy", a multi-platinum smash for Patsy Cline. In the wake of "Crazy"'s success, singers such as Bobby Darin and Wayne Newton covered "Who Can I Count On?". That same year Masters founded his own label, Galahad Records, which was not a vanity label, though Masters did release an album, May the Good Lord Bless You and Keep You, in 1964, as well as a few singles, on the label. He co-hosted a television program on KCOP in the 1960s and 1970s, and increasingly found work in TV production in the following decades.

In 1997, Masters signed with Dionysus Records and released Everybody Digs Sammy Masters, with Deke Dickerson and Ray Campi, hoping to make a comeback on the rockabilly revival scene in Europe and Japan. He toured in both areas at the end of the decade. Masters died on March 8, 2013, at age 82.

Discography

Singles

* Version of original "Pink Cadillac" with additional drums

EPs

References

External links
[ Sammy Masters] at Allmusic

1930 births
2013 deaths
American rockabilly musicians
Songwriters from Oklahoma
Four Star Records artists
Country musicians from Oklahoma